Dear Dictator is a 2014 South Korean drama film written and directed by South Korean indie provocateur Lee Sang-woo. It was first shown at the 15th Jeonju International Film Festival in 2014 and was one of the most talked about films of the event.

Synopsis
Buk-seong, Young-rim and Woo-seok are school dropouts from broken homes and live in a shanty town. One day, a North Korean spy begins video-recording their lives for use as part of North Korea's propaganda.

Cast
 Kim Yeong-geon as Buk-seong
 Shin Won-ho as Young-rim
 Seo Hyun-seok as Woo-seok
 Lee Joo-min as Hee-soo
 Jo Ha-suk as Spy
 Lee Tae-rim as Book-seong's father

Reception
Dear Dictator received generally positive critical reception.

References

External links
 
 
 

2014 films
South Korean black comedy films
2010s Korean-language films
Films directed by Lee Sang-woo
2010s South Korean films